Atralata is a genus of moths of the family Crambidae. It contains only one species, Atralata albofascialis, which is found in most of Europe, except Ireland, Great Britain, Norway, Finland, Lithuania and Greece.

The wingspan is 10–14 mm. There are two generations per year.

The larvae feed on Inula conyzae. They mine the leaves of their host plant. The mine has the form of a large brown blotch in the lower leaves. The frass is dispersed in the mine. Several larvae may be found in a single mine. Pupation takes place outside of the mine. Larvae can be found from May to August.

References

Odontiini
Monotypic moth genera
Moths of Europe
Crambidae genera
Taxa described in 1947